Global Star can refer to:

 Globalstar, a satellite system
 Global Star Software, a video game company